Marky or Markie may refer to:

Nickname
 Marky Cielo (1988–2008), Filipino actor and dancer
 Marky Delgado (born 1995), American soccer player
 Markie Mark (born 1974), BBC Radio director
 Marky Markowitz (1923–1986), American jazz trumpeter
 Markie Post (1950–2021), American actress

Stage name
 Marky Mark, stage name of Mark Wahlberg (born 1971), American actor and rapper
 Marky Ramone (born 1952), drummer for the Ramones
 DJ Marky (born 1975), Brazilian drum and bass DJ
 Biz Markie, American rapper Marcel Theo Hall (1964–2021)
 Marky (rapper), rapper/hip hopper Marcus D. Plater (born 1988)

Surname
 Alexandru Marky (1919–1969), Romanian football goalkeeper
 John Markie (born 1944), Scottish footballer

See also
 Markey (disambiguation)
 Marquee (disambiguation)

Lists of people by nickname